Metopeurum is a genus of true bugs belonging to the family Aphididae.

The species of this genus are found in Europe and Western Asia.

Species:
 Metopeurum achilleae Bozhko, 1959 
 Metopeurum borystenicum Bozhko, 1959
 Metopeurum buryatica (Pashtshenko, 1999)  
 Metopeurum capillatum (Börner, 1950) 
 Metopeurum enslini (Börner, 1933) 
 Metopeurum fuscoviride Stroyan, 1950 
 Metopeurum gentianae Mamontova & Tshumak, 1994 
 Metopeurum matricariae Bozhko, 1959 
 Metopeurum millefolii Mamontova & Tshumak, 1994 
 Metopeurum paeke 
 Metopeurum urticae Mamontova & Tshumak, 1994

References

Aphididae